Juan de Esturizada, O.P. (1611–1679) was a Roman Catholic prelate who served as Bishop of Santa Cruz de la Sierra (1672–1679).

Biography
Juan de Esturizada was born in Cusco, Peru and ordained a priest in the Order of Preachers. On May 16, 1672, he was selected by the King of Spain and confirmed by Pope Clement X as Bishop of Santa Cruz de la Sierra. He served as Bishop of Santa Cruz de la Sierra until his death in 1679.

References

External links and additional sources
 (for Chronology of Bishops) 
 (for Chronology of Bishops) 

1611 births
1679 deaths
People from Cusco
Bishops appointed by Pope Clement X
Dominican bishops
17th-century Roman Catholic bishops in Bolivia
Roman Catholic bishops of Santa Cruz de la Sierra